The 2019 Philadelphia Fusion season was the second season of the Philadelphia Fusion's existence in the Overwatch League and their first under co-head coaches Go Se-hwi and Elliot Hayes. They entered the season looking to bounce back after their 2018 Grand Finals loss to the London Spitfire.

The Fusion had a solid Stage 1 performance, finishing the stage with a 5–2 record and making it to the Stage 1 Playoffs, but they lost in the semifinals to the San Francisco Shock. After posting 3–4 and 4–3 records for Stage 2 and Stage 3, respectively, Philadelphia failed to qualify any other stage playoffs. A 3–1 victory over the Seoul Dynasty in their final regular season match gave the Fusion a 15–13 season record and qualified them for the Play-In Tournament. Philadelphia fell 2–4 to the Shanghai Dragons in the first round of the tournament, ending their hope of qualifying for the season playoffs.

Preceding offseason

Player re-signings and free agency 
From August 1 to September 9, 2018, all Overwatch League teams that competed in the 2018 season could choose to extend their team's players' contracts. Fusion elected to release Georgii "ShaDowBurn" Gushcha, Park "DayFly" Jeong-hwan, and Joseph "Joemeister" Gramano.

All non-expansion teams could not enter the free agency period until October 8, 2018; they were able to sign members from their respective academy team and make trades until then. On September 25, Fusion promoted support player Elijah "Elk" Gallagher from Fusion University on a two-way contract. On October 17, Fusion transferred Choi "Hotba" Hong-jun to the new expansion team Guangzhou Charge.

Head coach change 
In January, the Fusion announced that head coach Yann Luu would be acting as the organization's Director of Overwatch Operations. In his replacement, assistant coaches Elliot Hayes and Se-Hwi Go were promoted to co-head coaches.

Regular season 
Philadelphia opened their season on February 14 against the London Spitfire – a rematch of the 2018 Overwatch League Grand Finals. Philadelphia went on to win the match by a score of 3–1. The team finished with a 5–2 Stage 1 record and a Stage 1 Playoff berth. At the end of Stage 1, the Fusion was tied with the Toronto Defiant for the third seed of the playoffs. By rule, the teams would have to compete in an offline match to determine seeding; however, both teams agreed on a coin-flip, instead. Philadelphia received the fourth seed and would take on the Atlanta Reign in the quarterfinals. The Fusion's quarterfinal match took place on March 22 against the Atlanta Reign; the Fusion won the match, 3–1, advancing them to the Stage 1 semifinals. In the semifinals, Philadelphia was swept, 0–4, by the San Francisco Shock.

In Stage 2, on April 19, the Fusion defeated the Houston Outlaws, 4–0, marking their first 4–0 sweep of the 2019 season. The team finished the stage with a 3–4 record and did not qualify for the Stage 2 Playoffs.

In the last week of Stage 3, the Fusion headed to the Cobb Energy Performing Arts Centre in Atlanta to play at the "Atlanta Reign Homestand Weekend"; Philadelphia's final match of the stage was against the Shanghai Dragons. With both teams holding a 4–2 record in Stage 3, the winner of the match would qualify for the final spot in the Stage 3 Playoffs. The Fusion were unable to pull out the win, however, and fell in the match by a score of 1–3.

Prior to the start of Stage 4, which would include the implementation of an enforced 2-2-2 role lock by the League, the Fusion traded main tank Joona "Fragi" Laine to the Guangzhou Charge in exchange for DPS Finley "Kyb" Adisi.  Philadelphia finished the regular season in 10th place in the season standings with a 15–13 record and qualified for the Play-In Tournament.

Postseason 
Finishing in tenth place in the regular season standings, the Dragons qualified for the Play-In Tournament for the chance to qualify for the season playoffs. The team took on the eleventh-seeded Shanghai Dragons in the first round on August 30. The Dragon jumped out to an early 2–0 lead after winning on Busan and King's Row, but after the match break, Philadelphia forced a tie on Temple of Anubis and won on Watchpoint: Gibraltar. Shanghai recovered and took a win on Lijiang Tower, but the Fusion struck back with a win on King's Row. The Fusion selected Dorado for what would be the final map of the series; both teams completed the map on their respective attacks, but the Dragons managed to grab the map win in overtime rounds. The 2–4 loss eliminated the Fusion from playoff contention.

Final roster

Transactions 
Transactions of/for players on the roster during the 2019 regular season:
On July 17, Fusion traded Joona "Fragi" Laine to Guangzhou Charge in exchange for Finley "Kyb" Adisi.

Standings

Record by stage

League

Game log

Regular season

Playoffs

Awards 
On May 1, Lee "Carpe" Jae-hyeok was named as a starter for the 2019 Overwatch League All-Star Game. A week later Gael "Poko" Gouzerch was named as a reserve for the All-Star Game.

References 

2019 Overwatch League seasons by team
Philadelphia Fusion
Philadelphia Fusion seasons